Tornike Mataradze is a Georgian rugby union player. He plays for Georgia and for Lyon in the Top 14.

References

1996 births
Living people
Expatriate rugby union players from Georgia (country)
Expatriate rugby union players in France
Expatriate sportspeople from Georgia (country) in France
Georgia international rugby union players
Lyon OU players
Rugby union players from Georgia (country)
Rugby union props